Jingxi Subdistrict is a subdistrict in Baiyun District, Guangzhou, Guangdong province, China. , it has 16 residential communities under its administration:
Jingpeng Community
Meihuayuan Community
Southern Medical University Community
Jinghai Community
Hengjunhuayuan Community
Jinglong Community
Jingyu Community
Baihuichang Community
Jinglin Community
Dongsheng Community
Xiniujiao Community
Maidi Community
Jinlin Community
Meiyuan Community
Yunjinghuayuan Community
Baitian'ehuayuan Community

See also 
 List of township-level divisions of Guangdong

References 

Township-level divisions of Guangdong
Baiyun District, Guangzhou
Subdistricts of the People's Republic of China